Augusto Pereira Loureiro (born 30 August 1987), known simply as Augusto, is a Portuguese professional footballer who plays as a left back.

Club career
Born in Matosinhos, Augusto played youth football for three clubs, including FC Porto from ages 8–15. He spent his first five years as a senior in the lower leagues, with F.C. Infesta and G.D. Ribeirão.

Augusto signed for Segunda Liga side Moreirense F.C. in the summer of 2011, making his debut in the competition on 8 January 2012 by coming on as a late substitute in a 2–0 home win against C.D. Santa Clara. He played 13 games during the campaign, helping his team return to the Primeira Liga as runners-up.

Augusto joined US Créteil-Lusitanos from France in 2013, going on to spend several years in Ligue 2.

References

External links

1987 births
Living people
Sportspeople from Matosinhos
Portuguese footballers
Association football defenders
Primeira Liga players
Liga Portugal 2 players
Segunda Divisão players
G.D. Ribeirão players
Moreirense F.C. players
Ligue 2 players
US Créteil-Lusitanos players
Ekstraklasa players
Śląsk Wrocław players
Portuguese expatriate footballers
Expatriate footballers in France
Expatriate footballers in Poland
Portuguese expatriate sportspeople in France
Portuguese expatriate sportspeople in Poland